Clare in the Community is a British radio comedy series, broadcast on  BBC Radio 4, starring Sally Phillips as Clare. It was adapted from the comic strip of the same name which appeared in The Guardian newspaper, written by Harry Venning. The title is a play on words relating to care in the community.

Clare is a social worker who likes to sort out other people's problems while ignoring her own. She is white, middle class and heterosexual, but does not like to be reminded of it. She is a control freak but both her personal and professional lives are out of control.

TV pilot

In 2002 ITV commissioned a sitcom based on Harry Venning's comic strip. Two episodes were commissioned and a pilot episode, written by Venning and David Ramsden and starring Julia Sawalha in the title role, was produced by Tiger Aspect. The pilot was not picked up for a full series and has never been broadcast.

Radio series 

In 2004 a radio sitcom, co-written by David Ramsden and produced by Katie Tyrrell, was made for BBC Radio 4, starring Sally Phillips as Clare. Repeats have also been broadcast on BBC7 (now Radio 4 Extra). Series 1 to 5 have been released on CD by BBC Audio.  Series 6 was broadcast in 2010.  Series 7 was broadcast in 2011. The first series won the Bronze Comedy Award at the 2005 Sony Radio Awards.

The series occasionally breaks the fourth wall, with references to (for instance) a comic strip in The Guardians social-work supplement which (the somewhat humourless) Clare does not understand, an old schoolmate of Brian's named Richard Lumsden who wanted to be an actor but was never heard of again, and Nina Conti (as Nali) being given the line "It's not like I'm a ventriloquist." The final series in particular breaks the fourth wall in nearly every episode, with Clare and Brian trying to remember how old their son is now in the first episode (reflecting how his age fluctuates slightly in different series), Joanie believing (or realising) that she is trapped in a pre-scripted comedy series, "comedienne and ventriloquist Nina Conti" being a member on the panel of a (fictional) episode of Any Questions? that Clare and Mrs. Singh attend, and in the final episode, where Nali (played by Conti) is seemingly a terrorist holding Clare hostage, she comments, in each relevant voice, that she could just as easily be Maggie or various other characters that Conti has voiced over the course of the series. Additionally, the series regularly makes references to other comedies, such as Clare mimicking the catchphrase of Mrs. Doyle from Father Ted and Brian imitating Tony Hancock from "The Blood Donor" episode.

Clare often brings home her work problems which is just one of the main reasons why her relationship with Brian struggles. They often attend couples-counselling classes. Clare not only wears the trousers in their relationship but her self-centred neglect of Brian stresses him out. He often talks to his libertine friend and fellow schoolteacher Simon about her.

Clare's fellow social workers are often involved in her storylines. These include the rich yet unhygienic gay man Ray; Megan, Clare's Scottish mother-of-one former student. Helen, the laziest of the workers, is played by three actresses over the series; in series 6 team leader, Irene, a black woman, is replaced by Libby, "an Aussie and a lesbo—and proud of both".

Although she has a son Clare leaves her child duties primarily to her husband Brian and Nali. Despite their child, both continue to argue and have problems in their relationship. In series 9 Clare leaves Brian only to return to him in the series finale after her love interest has shown little knowledge of remembering who she is.

Simon Elmes called it "an instant hit, capturing the PC tone of our times".  The Stage reviewed series 8 positively, praising the first episode as "a brilliant opener", and after the series finale calling it "the best comedy on radio" and Phillips "the mistress of comic timing".

The twelfth series was trailed as the final series.

Cast

Episodes

Series one

Series two

Series three 
At the start of the series, Clare and Brian are staying at Simon's flat. Megan's daughter Brenda is now almost a year old.

Series four 

Irene has been promoted to team leader which causes resentment between her and Clare. Brian and Clare make frequent trips to couples counselling and have also been trying for a baby.

Series five 
Clare and Brian now have a son, Thomas, and a full-time nanny for him, the east-European Nali (also played by Nina Conti). Helen is now played by Liza Tarbuck.

Series six 
Clare's position at the Family Centre is now challenged by Irene's replacement, Libby (Sarah Kendall), and Brian harbours erotic fantasies about Nali. In this series Simon is played by Philip Pope.

Series seven 
Brian is eventually forgiven for his infidelity with Nali's sister and Clare accepts his proposal of marriage, while Nali enters Conservative politics. Andrew Wincott returns as Simon.

Series eight

Edinburgh special

Series nine 
Joan Hastings becomes a regular character (introduced in series 8, episode 6) as Megan's maternity cover.

Christmas With...

Series ten 
In this series Helen is played by Pippa Haywood.

Series eleven

Series twelve

References

External links
 
 
Latest comic strips from The Guardian
Harry Venning's Clare in the Community website
Radio Times episode guide

BBC Radio comedy programmes
2004 radio programme debuts
2019 radio programme endings
Clare in the Community